Buzk's Gard National Nature Park covers an area along the Southern Bug River in south-central Ukraine.  At this point, the Southern Bug River cuts through the southern edge of the Ukrainian Shield (a block of Archean basement rock).  The park is therefore a canyon that transitions the river from the upland plateau to the steppe region.  The name can be translated as "Bug Gard", where a 'gard' was a type of fishing structure used in the Cossack era.  The park is spread in sections over Voznesensk and Pervomaisk districts of Mykolaiv Oblast.  The major portions are about 140 km upstream from the estuary of the Southern Bug at the Black Sea.

Topography

The park coincides with the "Granite-steppe lands of Buh" Regional Landscape Park, a designation which has high status as an area of scenic importance, but which does not provide as strong a set of protections as the National Park status.  The park, which is a collection of nearby tracts, is mostly centered on the Southern Bug River where the river transitions from the uplands to the steppe.  The drop occurs in a relatively narrow canyon with granite outcrops and numerous ledges, rapids, and islands.

Ecoregion and climate
Buzk's Gard is located towards the western edge of the Pontic–Caspian steppe ecoregion.  The climate classified as Humid continental climate, warm summer (Köppen climate classification (Dfb)). This climate is characterized by large swings in temperature, both diurnally and seasonally, with mild summers and cold, snowy winters.  Precipitation averages 450 – 500 mm/year.

Flora and fauna
Biodiversity is high as the park stands at a transition point between upland forest and lowland steppe.  Scientists on the park have recorded 900 species of plants, and 300 species of vertebrates.  The upper plateau is partially forested, the fall zone features rocky terrain of brush and sedges transitioning to steppe vegetation.

Public use
Most visitors to the park arrive as part of sponsored tour groups, or those with lodging arrangements.  Individuals wishing to visit are to expected to contact the administrative offices in advance to obtain information on park rules.  The park offers public ecotrails and tours.

See also
 National Parks of Ukraine

References

External links

National parks of Ukraine